The Dixie-Monon Athletic Conference was an IHSAA-sanctioned conference in Southern Indiana. The conference was formed as a merger between the Dixie and Southern Monon conferences in 1965, and by its third year had grown to 12 members. However, soon after, consolidation started chipping away at the conference, and it ended in 1974, as only three schools were left.

Membership

 Played concurrently in DMC and JCC 1965–67.
 Played concurrently in DMC and LCC 1965–70.

Resources
 Old Dixie Conference

Indiana high school athletic conferences
High school sports conferences and leagues in the United States
Indiana High School Athletic Association disestablished conferences